Rice–Pennebecker Farm, also known as Fox Meadow Farm, is a historic farm and national historic district located in West Pikeland Township, Chester County, Pennsylvania.   The farm has four contributing buildings and one contributing structure.  They are the main house, a wagon shed, stone barn, corn crib, and storage building.  The main house is in four sections; the earliest dates 1767, with additions and modifications made in 1831–1832, c. 1870, and 1960.  The oldest section forms the rear wing.  The 1831-1832 addition is the main part and is a two-story, five bay, stone structure in the Georgian style.

It was added to the National Register of Historic Places in 1986.

References

Farms on the National Register of Historic Places in Pennsylvania
Historic districts on the National Register of Historic Places in Pennsylvania
Houses completed in 1767
Houses completed in 1832
Houses completed in 1870
Houses completed in 1960
Houses in Chester County, Pennsylvania
1767 establishments in Pennsylvania
National Register of Historic Places in Chester County, Pennsylvania